Anselm Joseph McLaurin (March 26, 1848December 22, 1909) was the 34th Governor of Mississippi, serving from 1896 to 1900.

Life and career
McLaurin was born on March 26, 1848, in Brandon, Mississippi, the son of Ellen Caroline (Tullus) and Lauchlin McLaurin III. He married Laura Elvira Rauch and had a daughter, Stella May McLaurin.

He became district attorney at age 21 and was described as "one of the foremost lawyers in the State". He participated in the convention for the writing of the Mississippi Constitution in 1890 and was described as a free-coinage man. A Democrat, as were most whites in the South through the mid-twentieth century, McLaurin was elected by the state legislature to the  U.S. Senate, serving from 1894 to 1895.

He was the first Governor of Mississippi to be elected under the Mississippi Constitution of 1890, which disenfranchised most blacks by raising barriers to voter registration. These changes essentially ended the competitiveness of the Republican Party in the state and severely weakened the Populist Party. The last Confederate veteran elected as governor, McLaurin won the 1895 election, defeating Populist Frank Burkitt. He served from 1896 to 1900.

At Hazlehurst in 1898, McLaurin explained in a speech that one of the causes of the depleted state treasury was inadequate taxation of the railroad corporations.

In October 1898, McLaurin traveled by train to Forest, Mississippi, after white rioting in nearby Harperville.  Blacks had resisted the arrest of one of their community, killing one white man. A mob of whites quickly gathered, killing nine blacks by the next day. The county sheriff and a posse arrested some blacks, while the white lynch mob continued to kill blacks on sight. The New Orleans Picayune said that 11 black men were killed and one white. The sheriff took several black men under armed guard to Meridian, Mississippi, to protect them from the white mobs in Forest.

McLaurin returned to the U.S. Senate in 1901 after being elected by the state legislature to that seat in 1900; he was re-elected on January 19, 1904.

He died of heart disease at age 61 on December 22, 1909, at his home in Brandon, Mississippi. He was sitting in a rocking chair in front of his fireplace.

Legacy
A great-great-grandson of McLaurin was actor and comedian Robin Williams, who was given McLaurin as his middle name.

See also
List of United States Congress members who died in office (1900–49)

References

External links

 
 Anselm J. McLaurin, late a senator from Mississippi, Memorial addresses delivered in the House of Representatives and Senate frontispiece 1911

1848 births
1909 deaths
American people of Scottish descent
Confederate States Army soldiers
District attorneys in Mississippi
Democratic Party governors of Mississippi
Democratic Party United States senators from Mississippi
People from Brandon, Mississippi
Robin Williams